Gastón Gaudio was the defending champion, but lost in the second round this year.

José Acasuso won the title, defeating Nicolás Massú 6–4, 6–3 in the final.

This was the first ATP tournament in which future Grand Slam champion Juan Martín del Potro entered.

Seeds

  Gastón Gaudio (second round)
  Fernando González (semifinals)
  José Acasuso (champion)
  Agustín Calleri (first round)
  Nicolás Massú (final)
  Albert Montañés (quarterfinals)
  Carlos Berlocq (first round)
  Boris Pašanski (quarterfinals)

Draw

Finals

Top half

Bottom half

External links
 2006 Movistar Open Draw
 2006 Movistar Open Qualifying Draw

Singles